Vladimir Fedorovich Petrovsky (29 April 1933, Stalingrad – 21 February 2014) was a Soviet/Russian diplomat, Ambassador, professor in history, politician and writer.

He served as Deputy Foreign Minister of the Soviet Union under Soviet General Secretary Mikhail Gorbachev. In 1992 he became UN Under-Secretary-General for Political Affairs in New York. From 1993–2002 he was Director-General of the United Nations Office at Geneva. During this time he was also Secretary-General of the Conference for Disarmament. After his retirement from the United Nations V. Petrovsky established the non-governmental organization Comprehensive Dialogue Among Civilizations (CDAC). 
 
Vladimir Petrovsky died on 21 February 2014 after a long illness. Mira Petrovsky, his wife lives in Moscow, together with their daughter Lena.

Biography

Public service
1957–1961:
 Attache, Permanent Mission of the USSR to the United Nations, New York

1961–1964:
 Second Secretary, Office of the Foreign Minister of the USSR

1964–1971:
 Political Affairs Officer, Chief of Unit, United Nations Secretariat, New York

1971–1979:
 Chief Counselor, Head of American Division of the Policy Planning Department, Foreign Ministry of the USSR

1972–1975:
 Secretary-General of the USSR Delegation to the CSCE, Geneva

1979–1986:
 Head of International Organizations' Department, Foreign Ministry of the USSR Member of the USSR Foreign Ministry's Collegium

1986–1991:
 Deputy Foreign Minister of the USSR
 Head of USSR Delegations to the United Nations General Assembly, UNESCO, IAEA, UNEP, and various European fora, including the CSCE

1991:
 First Deputy Foreign Minister of the USSR
 Executive Secretary of the OSCE Conference on the Human Dimension

1992:
 Representative of Russia to the NATO Council of Cooperation

1992–1993:
 Under-Secretary-General for Political Affairs, United Nations, New York
 Special Envoy of the UN Secretary-General to Libya

1998:
 Special Envoy of the UN Secretary-General to Libya
 Special Representative of the UN Secretary-General in Albania

1993–2002:
 Under-Secretary-General, Director-General of the United Nations Office at Geneva
 Secretary-General of the Conference on Disarmament
 Personal Representative of the UN Secretary-General to the Conference on Disarmament

2002–2010:
 Senior Research Fellow, UNITAR, Geneva
 Consultant to the Russian Council of Federation, Moscow
 Head of the Center for Politico-Diplomatic, Intercultural and Inter-religious Dialogue, Institute of Europe, Russian Academy of Sciences, Moscow
 Chairman of the NGO Association 'Comprehensive Dialogue Among Civilizations' (CDaC), Geneva
 Chairman of Maecenas World Patrimony Foundation, Geneva
 Member of the Board International Dialogues Foundation IDF, The Hague
 Member of the Board Museum Geelvinck, Amsterdam

Formal education
Doctorate in History, Institute of international Relations and World Economy, 1975

LL.D, Moscow State Institute of International Relations, 1962

MA, Moscow State Institute of International Relations, 1957

Foreign Ministry of the Former Soviet Union

Cuban Missile Crisis
During October 1962 Vladimir Petrovsky worked in the office of Foreign Minister Andrey Gromyko. There were long periods of non-stop work in the Foreign Ministry building on Smolenskaya Square in Moscow to attend emergency meetings and action groups to resolve the Cuban Missile Crisis. On 27 October 1962 the USSR Ministry of Foreign Affairs prepared a positive response to the US request for the withdrawal of Soviet missiles from Cuba in exchange for US government's assurances on compliance with the territorial integrity of the island. Vladimir Petrovsky later analyzed this intense period in his memoirs.

The Helsinki Final Act
Vladimir Petrovsky was strongly involved in researching and drafting all the details of the Soviet delegation's position towards the Helsinki Process followed by the Helsinki Final Act (The Helsinki Accords). It was signed during July and 1 August 1975 and became at the time a declaration of attempt to improve relations between the Communist bloc and the West. The Helsinki Accords served as the groundwork for the Organization for Security and Cooperation in Europe(OSCE).

Perestroika

Before announcing Perestroika in 1987, the Soviet government had done a multi-level research and analytical work accomplished by both the political and academical elite. In 1986 Vladimir Petrovsky was appointment as Deputy Foreign Minister of the USSR and received the task to help promote the process later known as glasnost (openness) with an assignment to supervise the Press Department, while being also in charge of other areas in the Foreign Ministry. Vladimir Petrovsky was among the specialists of the Ministry of Foreign Affairs that were chosen to formulate the progressive concepts for the framework of the New Political Thinking. In 1988 Vladimir Petrovsky was part of the task force preparing the draft for the landmark address that Soviet General Secretary Gorbachev gave at the UN General Assembly on 6 December 1988.

The United Nations
In February 1992 Vladimir Petrovsky was appointed as the UN's Under-Secretary-General for Political Affairs and soon become chairman of the drafting committee for the 'Agenda for Peace". He served in this position until March 1993 when he was appointed to become Director-General of the UN Office in Geneva. He strongly promoted better cooperation among the different UN agencies as well as with regional organisations and the host country Switzerland.

Disarmament
Throughout his long diplomatic career Vladimir Petrovsky strongly stressed the essential role that disarmament should play in the comprehensive approach to security in the world. In 1978, he became a member of the Soviet delegation to the First Special Session of the UN General Assembly on Disarmament. He was involved in working out the details of the multilateral machinery for disarmament and the rules for the Conference on Disarmament (CD). In 1979, after the Soviet invasion of Afghanistan the only possibility to communicate with the West on the diplomatic level were consultations on nuclear weapons nonproliferation. In 1993, Vladimir Petrovsky became the Secretary-General of the Conference on Disarmament (CD) in Geneva, the organization for which he had helped to develop the rules of conduct earlier in 1978. Under his chairmanship the Conference on Disarmament in Geneva was able to negotiate the Comprehensive Test Ban Treaty, signed in 1996. He remained in the position of CD's Secretary-General until his retirement from the United Nations in 2002.

NGO – Comprehensive Dialogue among Civilizations

During his work at the United Nations, Vladimir Petrovsky promoted dialogue in all aspects, organizing a wide spectrum of events such as masterclasses, art and photo exhibitions and musical performances at the Palais des Nations. Encouraged by this work at the UN, Petrovsky founded the non-governmental organization – Comprehensive Dialogue Among Civilizations (CDAC) upon his retirement from the UN in 2002. The uniqueness of the organisation was the multifaceted approach to dialogue. His last publication "The Triad of Strategic Security of the Global Community" (2007), fell into this period.

After his passing in 2014, the book "Vladimir Petrovsky: The Master Diplomat” was published in 2015, highlighting his political vision and his major achievements in the field of political and public service.

Vladimir Petrovsky and art
“The state of the nation, its sense of beauty and its humour, its dreams and its history – everything is reflected in its art. I hope that this exhibition at the Palais des Nations will help many people who are coming here from all over the world to better understand Russian culture and the so-called mysterious "Russian soul".

Vladimir Petrovsky’s Welcome address to the art exhibit "Russian Collection in the Palais des Nations" 9.06.1997

Vladimir Petrovsky had been introduced to Salvador Dalí, was in frequent contact with famous sculptors and artists such as Ernst Neizvestny, Michail Chemyakin, Michail and Vita Romadin and Leonid Sokov.

Under his aegis the World Patrimony Foundation was established, which restored the Henrik Sørensen wallpainting "Le Rêve de la Paix" in the Library of the Palais des Nations and Marc Chagall's "Peace Window" in the Hall of the United Nations Office in New York.

He also entertained a close friendship for many years with artist and spiritual leader Sri Chinmoy.

Significant publications

Foreign Service of Great Britain, 1958
Diplomacy of 10 Downing Street, 1964
Foreign Policy Thinking in the United States: Theories and Concepts, 1976
Doctrine of National Security in the US Global Strategy, 1980
Dialogue for Peace. Participation of the USSR in Multilateral Diplomacy, 1980
Disarmament: Concept, Problems and Mechanisms, 1983
Security in the Era of Nuclear and Outer Space Technology, 1985
The Triad of Strategic Security of the Global Community, 2007
Vladimir Petrovsky: The Master-Diplomat, 2015

External links
 Vladimir Petrovsky: The Master-Diplomat
 CDAC
 UN Geneva office
 Conference on Disarmament
 Russian Academy of Sciences
 Institute of Europe
 Le Temps
 United Nations Intellectual Property Project
 War and Peace in the Nuclear Age
 Interview by Metta Spencer
 Peace Operations as an Integrated Part of the UN Strategy
 Project on Intellectual Property Rights
 Transcend Media Service

1933 births
2014 deaths
Burials at Vagankovo Cemetery
Moscow State Institute of International Relations alumni
Recipients of the Order of the Red Banner of Labour
Russian diplomats
Politicians from Volgograd
Soviet diplomats
Soviet politicians
Special Envoys of the Secretary-General of the United Nations
Special Representatives of the Secretary-General of the United Nations
Under-Secretaries-General of the United Nations